Leucargyra is a genus of moths of the family Crambidae.

Species
Leucargyra puralis Hampson, 1896
Leucargyra xanthoceps Hampson, 1919

References

Schoenobiinae
Crambidae genera
Taxa named by George Hampson